Dark Corners is a 2015 crime fiction novel by British writer Ruth Rendell, the last she wrote before her death that same year.
The novel has no dedication or epigraph. The title of the book is taken from a phrase in the William Shakespeare play Measure for Measure.

References

2015 British novels
Novels by Ruth Rendell
Hutchinson (publisher) books